Piotr Czesław Brożek (born 21 April 1983) is a Polish footballer who plays as a left-back or on the left wing.

Club career
Born in Kielce, Piotr was a product of the Polonia Białogon Kielce youth system, and moved to Wisła Kraków in 1998. He made his Ekstraklasa debut for Wisła Kraków on 8 September 2001, in a match against GKS Katowice.

During the 2004–05 Ekstraklasa season, Piotr was loaned to Górnik Zabrze; there he appeared in 22 games, scoring 3 goals.

Brożek won the Ekstraklasa championship six times with Wisła Kraków.

In January 2011, Brożek, together with his twin brother Paweł, joined Turkish Süper Lig side Trabzonspor on a -year deal for an undisclosed fee from Wisła Kraków.

International career
Piotr Brożek has played internationally for Poland, beginning with the Under-15 level and up to the national team. He made his first appearance for the Poland national football team on 8 February 2008, in a friendly match against Finland.

Personal life
His twin brother, Paweł Brożek, is also a footballer.

Honours

Club
Wisła Kraków
 Ekstraklasa: 2002–03, 2003–04, 2004–05, 2007–08, 2008–09, 2010–11
 Polish Cup: 2001–02, 2002–03
 Polish SuperCup: 2001

Career statistics

International goals
Scores and results list Poland's goal tally first.

References

External links
 
 National team stats on the website of the Polish Football Association 

1983 births
Living people
Sportspeople from Kielce
Association football fullbacks
Association football wingers
Polish footballers
Poland international footballers
Wisła Kraków players
ŁKS Łódź players
Górnik Zabrze players
Trabzonspor footballers
Lechia Gdańsk players
Piast Gliwice players
Ekstraklasa players
Süper Lig players
Polish twins
Twin sportspeople